Davao Oriental's 2nd congressional district is one of the two congressional districts of the Philippines in the province of Davao Oriental. It has been represented in the House of Representatives since 1987. The district covers the provincial capital city of Mati and the southern municipalities of Banaybanay, Governor Generoso, Lupon and San Isidro. It is currently represented in the 18th Congress by Joel Mayo Z. Almario of the PDP–Laban.

Representation history

Election results

2019

2016

2013

2010

See also
Legislative districts of Davao Oriental

References

Congressional districts of the Philippines
Politics of Davao Oriental
1987 establishments in the Philippines
Congressional districts of the Davao Region
Constituencies established in 1987